The Progressive Party (PP) was a political party in Brazil founded in 1993 by:
the Social Labour Party
the Reform Labour Party.

In 1995 the party merged with the Reform Progressive Party into Brazilian Progressive Party.

This new party re-changed its name to the Progressive Party in 2003.

Its first national president was Alvaro Dias, former governor and now senator for Podemos in the state of Paraná, having been a candidate for the government of Paraná in 1994, coming in 2nd place, being defeated by Jaime Lerner

1993 establishments in Brazil
1995 disestablishments in Brazil
Defunct political parties in Brazil
Political history of Brazil
Political parties disestablished in 1995
Political parties established in 1993